David Lundbohm (born December 17, 1979, in Roseau, Minnesota) is an American professional ice hockey forward.  He currently plays for Växjö Lakers Hockey in the Swedish HockeyAllsvenskan.

He previously played in the Deutsche Eishockey Liga for the Straubing Tigers and in the Finnish SM-liiga for TPS.  He also played in the ECHL for the Florida Everblades and the American Hockey League for the Providence Bruins.

External links

1979 births
Living people
People from Roseau, Minnesota
American men's ice hockey forwards
Fargo-Moorhead Ice Sharks players
Florida Everblades players
North Dakota Fighting Hawks men's ice hockey players
Providence Bruins players
Straubing Tigers players
HC TPS players
Ice hockey players from Minnesota